How Do You Love? is the second studio album by the American punk rock band The Regrettes. It was released on August 9, 2019 through Warner Bros., as the follow-up to their previous album Feel Your Feelings Fool!. The album was produced by Mike Elizondo.

Reception
How Do You Love? was mostly met with positive reviews, and holds a score of 77/100 on Metacritic

Track listing

Personnel

The Regrettes
Lydia Night - lead vocals, rhythm guitar
Genessa Gariano - lead guitar, backing vocals
Drew Thomsen - drums, percussion, backing vocals
Brooke Dickson - bass guitar, backing vocals

Other personnel
Brent Arrowood - engineer
Mike Elizondo - production
Adam Hawkins - engineer, mixing
Alonzo Lazaro - engineer
Henry Lunetta - editing
Rachael Moore - assistant engineer
Alex Tenta - art direction, design

References

The Regrettes albums
Warner Records albums
2019 albums
Albums produced by Mike Elizondo